Vatroslav Jagić (July 6, 1838 – August 5, 1923) was a Croatian scholar of Slavic studies in the second half of the 19th century.

Life
Jagić was born in Varaždin, where he attended the elementary school and is the place where he started his secondary-school education. He finished that level of education at the Gymnasium in Zagreb. Having a particular interest in philology, he moved to Vienna, where he was lectured in Slavic studies under the guidance of Franz Miklosich. He continued his studies and defended his doctoral dissertation Das Leben der Wurzel 'dê in Croatischen Sprachen  in Leipzig (Germany) in 1871.

Upon finishing his studies, Jagić returned to Zagreb, where from 1860 to 1870 he held the position of professor at a Croatian high school.

In 1869, Jagić was elected a full member of the Yugoslav Academy of Sciences and Arts (now named the Croatian Academy of Sciences and Arts), and a correspondent member of the Russian Academy of Sciences in Saint Petersburg. Next year, 1871, he became a professor of Slavic studies at Odessa University (Novorossiysk University) and worked also in Berlin, where he moved in 1874 to become the very first professor of Slavic studies at the prestigious Friedrich Wilhelm University of Berlin. Jagić held this post until 1880, when he moved again and became teacher at the University of St Petersburg.

In 1886, he returned to Vienna, where his studies started to be a replacement for retiring former lecturer Miklosich at the University of Vienna. Here he taught, did research, and published until his own retirement in 1908.

Jagić died in Vienna but was laid to rest in his native Varaždin.

Works
Works on literature and language written by Jagić started to be published for the first time in the reports of the high school where he worked. In 1863, with his fellow researchers Josip Torbar and Franjo Rački he launched the journal Književnik. In this journal, he published several articles regarding the problems of the grammar, syntax, orthography, and history of the language used by Croats. His works were noticed within the Yugoslav Academy of Sciences and Arts (JAZU), founded in Croatia in 1866. His works were mainly related to verbs, paleography, vocalization of the language, folk poetry, and its sources. He polemicised against the Rijeka Philological School through scathing reviews of 's books Recimo koju (Let's Say a Few Words, 1860) and Fluminensia (1862), and especially against the dominant Zagreb Philological School, represented by Adolfo Veber Tkalčević and Bogoslav Šulek, regarding the problems of orthography and pronunciation (Naš pravopis [Our Orthography], 1864). Although earlier he had held the opposite stance (Quomodo scribamus nos? [How Do We Write?], 1859), in the 1864 article he criticised Zagreb School's usage of the -ah ending in the genitive plural form of nouns, as it lacked basis in the history of language, instead arguing for the -â ending, in line with the norm espoused by Vuk Karadžić and his followers; he also argued for introducing moderate elements of phonemic orthography to the otherwise morphological and etymological norm of the Zagreb School. In his arguments he introduced the methods of comparative linguistics in Croatia, and their influence paved the way for Vukovian standard prevailing over Zagreb School's. However, in the following decades he also criticised Vukovian scholarship (Maretić's 1899 grammar, and Broz's and Iveković's 1901 dictionary, among others).

He prepared many criticial editions of premodern texts, mainly Croatian and Old Church Slavonic. He was among the founders of the Stari pisci hrvatski [Old Croatian Writers] series published by JAZU, which focused on publishing Croatian literature from the Renaissance to the era of the Illyrian movement, beginning with an edition of the works of Marko Marulić (1869, co-edited by Jagić and Ivan Kukuljević Sakcinski). Elsewhere he published critical editions of medieval Croatian texts, Glagolitic texts such as Codex Zographensis (1879), Codex Marianus (1883), Kiev Missal and Fragmenta Vindobonensia (1890), and others.

In Berlin, he started publishing the Archiv für slavische Philologie (Archive for Slavic Philology) in 1875, and kept editing it for 45 years. The periodical focused the attention of scholars and the general public on the Slavs, increasing their interest in Slavic languages and their culture. It also confirmed the importance of Slavic studies, its methodology, and its validity as a scholarly discipline.

While in Vienna, his intention was to write an encyclopedia related to the philology of the Slavs. This idea led him to write Istorija slavjanskoj filologii [History of Slavic philology]. This book was published in St. Petersburg in 1910 and in detail describes the development of Slavic studies from the beginning to the end of the 19th century.

In his work on Old Church Slavic he concluded and proved that the language did not originate in the central plains of Pannonia, as it was previously claimed by Jernej Kopitar and Franz Miklošič, but in southern Macedonia. In his later years he also studied the life and works of Juraj Križanić (1618–1683), a Dominican priest that had shown considerable interest in Pan-Slavism and cooperation between Catholicism and Orthodoxy.

Jagić's work is impressive in scope and quality: Croatian linguist Josip Hamm has remarked that Jagić's collected works would, put together, number more than 100 volumes of large format.

Among his most famous students were the Polish Slavic specialist Aleksander Brückner and the Ukrainian poet and scholar Ivan Franko.

Selected bibliography

A complete bibliography of Jagić's works has been published in Izabrani kraći spisi (1948).

Books
 Gramatika jezika hèrvatskoga: osnovana na starobugarskoj slovenštini. Dio pèrvi: Glasovi [Grammar of the Croatian Language: Based on Old Church Slavonic. Part One: Sounds] (1864). Zagreb: Brzotiskom Antuna Jakića. (NSK)
 Historija književnosti naroda hrvatskoga i srbskoga [History of the Literature of Croatian and Serbian People] (1867). Zagreb: Štamparija Dragutina Albrechta.
 Ruska književnost u osamnaestom stoljeću [Russian Literature in the Eighteenth Century] (1895). Slike iz svjetske književnosti. Svezak treći. Zagreb: Matica hrvatska. (Archive.org)
 Ягич, Игнатий Викентьевич. Исторія славянской филологіи [History of Slavic Philology] (1910). Энциклопедія славянской филологіи. Выпускъ 1. Санктпетербургъ: Императорская академія наукъ. (Электронная библиотека ГПИБ)
 Život i rad Jurja Križanića [Life and Work of Juraj Križanić] (1917). Zagreb: JAZU.
 Spomeni mojega života: I deo (1838-1880); II deo (1880-1923)  [Memories of My Life] (1930-1934). Beograd: Srpska kraljevska akademija.
 Izabrani kraći spisi [Selected Shorter Works] (1948). Edited and translated by Mihovil Kombol. Zagreb: Matica hrvatska.
 Djela Vatroslava Jagića IV.: Članci iz „Književnika“ III. (1866). Historija književnosti naroda hrvatskoga ili srbskoga [Works of Vatroslav Jagić IV] (1953). Edited by Slavko Ježić. Zagreb: Jugoslavenska akademija znanosti i umjetnosti.
 Rasprave, članci i sjećanja [Treatises, Articles and Memories] (1963). Edited by Marin Franičević, translated by Mihovil Kombol. Pet stoljeća hrvatske književnosti. Knjiga 43. Zagreb: Matica hrvatska, Zora.

Articles
 Naš pravopis [Our Orthography] (1864). In: Književnik. Godina prva. pp 1-34, 151-180. (Google Books)
 Trubaduri i najstariji hrvatski lirici [Troubadours and the Oldest Croatian Lyric Poets] (1869). In: "Rad" Jugoslavenske akademije znanosti i umjetnosti, knjiga IX. (Archive.org)

Critical editions
 Quattuor Evangeliorum versionis palaeoslovenicae Codex Marianus Glagoliticus, characteribus Cyrillicis transcriptum (1883). Berlin: Weidmann. (Archive.org)

External links

 Jagić's biography in Croatian
 The grave of Vatroslav Jagic in Varazdin cemetery. on Flickr - Photo Sharing! at www.flickr.com
 A Portrait of Vatroslav Jagic (1838-1923) by Ivan Mestrovic in Varazdin town museum. on Flickr - Photo Sharing! at www.flickr.com

References 

1838 births
1923 deaths
People from Varaždin
Linguists from Croatia
Members of the Croatian Academy of Sciences and Arts
Full members of the Saint Petersburg Academy of Sciences
Full Members of the Russian Academy of Sciences (1917–1925)
Recipients of the Pour le Mérite (civil class)
Slavists
Academic staff of the Humboldt University of Berlin
Academic staff of Saint Petersburg State University
Academic staff of the University of Vienna
Croatian philologists
History of Varaždin